
Gmina Osie is a rural gmina (administrative district) in Świecie County, Kuyavian-Pomeranian Voivodeship, in north-central Poland.

The gmina contains part of the protected area called Wda Landscape Park.

Villages
Gmina Osie contains the villages and settlements of Brzeziny, Jaszcz, Łążek, Miedzno, Osie, Pruskie, Radańska, Stara Rzeka, Tleń, Wałkowiska and Wierzchy.

Neighbouring gminas
Gmina Osie is bordered by the gminas of Cekcyn, Drzycim, Jeżewo, Lniano, Osiek, Śliwice and Warlubie.

References
Polish official population figures 2006

Historical views of Osche / Osie

Osie
Świecie County